Agata Danuta Mróz-Olszewska (7 April 1982 – 4 June 2008) was a Polish volleyball player, a member of the Poland women's national volleyball team in 1997–2007, double European Champion (Turkey 2003, Croatia 2005). She died of an infection following a bone marrow transplant to treat Myelodysplastic syndrome, which she had suffered from since the age of 17.

Personal life
Agata was born in Dąbrowa Tarnowska, but raised in Tarnów. Her sister Katarzyna is a volleyball player and her brother Paweł a basketball player. On 9 June 2007, she married Jacek Olszewski. Since the age of 17, she suffered myelodysplastic syndrome. In 2007, she gave up her volleyball career because of her bone marrow disease, and began treatment. On 12 January 2008, she announced she was pregnant, and that as a result she could not change treatment. Their daughter Liliana was born prematurely on 4 April 2008.

On 22 May 2008, she had a bone marrow transplant in the Department of Bone Marrow Transplantation, Oncology and Hematology of the Medical University in Wrocław. She died fourteen days later from sepsis and septic shock. Her funeral was held on her first wedding anniversary, 9 June 2008.

Career

Clubs
Olszewska-Mróz began her career in Tarnovia Tarnów, then moved to SMS Sosnowiec, WSBiP Ostrowiec Świętokrzyski and BKS Stal Bielsko-Biała, where she was twice champion of Poland (2003 and 2004). She also played for the Spanish team Grupo 2002 Murcia, winning both the Championship of Spain and the Cup of Spain tournament (2007).

National team
She was one of the main competitors in the team led by coach Andrzej Niemczyk. She won two gold medals with the Polish national team at the European Championships: Turkey 2003 and Croatia 2005. On 22 November 2005, received a state award granted by the Polish President - Gold Cross of Merit for her contribution to the development of sport.

Sporting achievements

National team
 1999  CEV U19 European Championship
 2003  CEV European Championship
 2005  CEV European Championship

State awards
 2005  Gold Cross of Merit
 2009  Knight's Cross of Polonia Restituta (posthumously)

Memorial
Despite the latter posthumous award (badge), her husband did not accept it. He stated that the doctors who helped Agata should receive the distinction. On 11 May 2012, was the premiere of a film Nad życie about Agata Mroz-Olszewska, her private life, illness, marriage and the birth of her daughter. During the wedding scene among the guests appeared husband Jacek and daughter Liliana.

References

1982 births
Sportspeople from Tarnów
Polish women's volleyball players
Deaths from leukemia
Deaths from cancer in Poland
2008 deaths
Recipients of the Gold Cross of Merit (Poland)
Knights of the Order of Polonia Restituta